Tutova County is one of the historic counties of Moldavia, Romania with the city of Bârlad as capital.

Geography
Tutova County covered 2,498 km2 and was located in the central-eastern part of Greater Romania, in the south-eastern part of Moldavia. Currently, the territory that comprised Tutova County is now included primarily at present in Vaslui County, with some of its southern portions in Bacău County and Galați County. In the interwar period, the county neighbored Vaslui County to the north, Fălciu County to the northeast, Cahul County to the east, Covurlui County to the south, and Tecuci and Bacău counties to the west.

Administrative organization

Administratively, Tutova County was initially divided into three districts (plăși):
Plasa Alexandru Vlahuță, headquartered at Puiești
Plasa Monolache Epureanu, headquartered at Murgeni
Plasa Vasile Pârvan, headquartered at Grivița

Subsequently, after a reorganization, a fourth district was established:
Plasa I.G. Duca, headquartered at Banca

Population
According to the census data of 1930, the county had a population of 144,821, 93.7% Romanians, 2.9% Jews, 2.6% Romanies, 0.2% Germans, as well as other minorities. In religious terms, the county population consisted of 96.5% Eastern Orthodox, 2.9% Jewish, 0.3% Roman Catholic, as well as other minorities.

Urban population 
In 1930, the urban population of the county was 21,857 inhabitants, of which 81,9% were Romanians, 14,1% Jews, 0,8% Germans, as well as other minorities. From a religious point of view, the urban population was made up of 83.4% Eastern Orthodox, 14.2% Jewish, 1.0% Roman Catholic, as well as other minorities.

History
Tutova County was established in 1925, and broken up as a result of the 1950 administrative reform.

Interbellum
In July 1924, ultranationalist student and future Legionary, Constantin Buşila, led attacks against Jewish villages in Tutova County. In April 1932, Ion Zelea Codreanu, the father of Corneliu Zelea Codreanu, is elected to Parliament by the citizens of Tutova County, as a representative of the fascist Legionary movement led by his son.

References

External links

  Tutova County on memoria.ro

Former counties of Romania
1879 establishments in Romania
1938 disestablishments in Romania
1940 establishments in Romania
1950 disestablishments in Romania
States and territories established in 1879
States and territories disestablished in 1938
States and territories established in 1940
States and territories disestablished in 1950